The Safeway Bowl is the name given to the North Texas–SMU football rivalry. It is a college football rivalry game between the Southern Methodist University Mustangs football team and the University of North Texas Mean Green football team, two universities in Dallas–Fort Worth metroplex.

History
The two teams first met in 1922, with a 66–0 win for SMU over North Texas. The match-up has geographic relevance, as North Texas and SMU are the largest public and private universities in the DFW area respectively. As bitter cross-Metroplex rivals, the two teams have met 41 times in total.

Its name is derived from a challenge from former UNT head coach Matt Simon, who after a two year break in the series, stated "I'd like to play because I think we could beat them, and my players feel the same way. If they'd like to play on a Safeway parking lot ... just give us a date and time."

SMU leads the series 35–6–1, as the series had three major hiatuses since its original start. The series has been ongoing since its renewal in 2013, and is expected to continue as North Texas joins SMU in the American Athletic Conference in 2023.

Game results

Notes
• Despite having their home games at the Cotton Bowl for 46 years, North Texas played SMU there just twice. The first 21 games of the series came before the arrival of Doak Walker to SMU, whose play attracted the large crowds that prompted the school to move its home games out of Ownby Stadium to the larger venue in Fair Park.
• Of the 39 games played between the two schools, just five of those have taken place in Denton. Ownby Stadium was seen as the far superior venue to the tiny Eagle Field that North Texas played on before 1952, which sat just 5,000 people to Ownby's 23,000. When the series resumed in the 1970s, the Cotton Bowl and Texas Stadium both held vastly more fans than Fouts Field could. Only after SMU moved its home games back on campus following the death penalty did the schools start playing games in Denton. Fouts Field hosted its first Safeway Bowl in 1990, which North Texas won to snap a six-game losing streak in the series. 
• Both schools have largely had success in the series when playing on their campuses. North Texas holds a 4–3–0 record in games played at Fouts Field or Apogee Stadium, while SMU holds a remarkable 23–1–1 record in games played at Armstrong Field, Ownby Stadium, or Ford Stadium. SMU's only win on UNT's campus came on September 3, 2016 while UNT's only win on SMU's campus came on September 23, 1933. SMU leads the series 7–1–0 when the game was played at either the Cotton Bowl or Texas Stadium. 
• 16 of the 40 contests have ended with a shutout (40%), including the 1932 game which ended in a scoreless tie. North Texas was on the losing end of all of those shutouts except the tie and a 7–0 win in 1933 (UNT's most recent win on SMU's campus). The first six games of the series, all won by SMU, were also shutouts.

See also  
 List of NCAA college football rivalry games

References

College football rivalries in the United States
American football in the Dallas–Fort Worth metroplex
North Texas Mean Green football
SMU Mustangs football
Annual events in Texas
Sports competitions in Dallas
Recurring sporting events established in 1922
1922 establishments in Texas
Safeway Inc.